Leviathan / Xasthur is a split album featuring music from black metal bands Xasthur and Leviathan. Tracks 1 through 7 were performed by Xasthur, while tracks 8 through 10 were performed by Leviathan.

Track listing

 The Eerie Bliss and Torture (of Solitude) – 4:47
 Keeper of Sharpened Blades (and Ominous Fates) – 5:07
 Conjuration of Terror – 7:23
 Instrumental (drums by Wrest / Leviathan) – 3:39
 Achieve Emptiness* – 2:53
 Telepathic with the Deceased (rehearsal 11/04)* – 6:02
 Palace of Frost (Katatonia cover)* – 4:06
 Unfailing Fall Into Naught – 10:41
 The Remotest Cipher (Beside the Last Breath Banished) – 8:23
 Where the Winter Beats Incessant (Judas Iscariot cover)* – 11:56

 *Asterisks are bonus tracks featured on the re-released version.

References

2004 albums
Xasthur albums
Leviathan (musical project) albums
Southern Lord Records albums
Split albums
Profound Lore Records albums